Seto may refer to:

Places
Seto, Aichi, production place of Japanese pottery and venue of Expo 2005
Seto, Ehime, facing the Seto Inland Sea
Seto, Okayama, adjacent to Okayama, in Okayama Prefecture
Seto Inland Sea of Japan
Setomaa (Seto land), region in Estonia and Russia

People and fictional characters
Situ (surname), a Chinese surname (司徒), romanised from Cantonese as Seto or Szeto
Robert M. M. Seto (born 1936), American federal judge and law professor
Michael C. Seto (born 1967), Canadian psychologist and sex researcher
Andy Seto (born 1969), Hong Kong comic artist
Carwai Seto (born 1973), Canadian swimmer
 A Japanese surname (瀬戸)
Masato Seto (born 1953), Japanese photographer
Asaka Seto (born 1976), Japanese actress
Rocky Seto (born 1976), American football coach
Haruki Seto (born 1978), Japanese football player
Saori Seto (born 1983), Japanese voice actress
Taiki Seto (born 1983), Japanese Go player
Kōji Seto (born 1988), Japanese actor and singer
Takayuki Seto (born 1986), Japanese footballer
Asami Seto (born 1993), Japanese voice actress
Daiya Seto (born 1994), Japanese swimmer
Toshiki Seto (born 1995), Japanese actor
Yutaka Seto, fictional character in Battle Royale
Ichitaka Seto, fictional character in I"s
A given name or nickname
Devin Setoguchi (born 1987), Canadian professional hockey player nicknamed "Seto"
Seto Kaiba, main character from the Japanese manga and anime series Yu-Gi-Oh!
Seto Kamiki, character from the Japanese anime Tenchi Muyo!
Seto, the father of Red XIII in the video game Final Fantasy VII

Other uses
Setos, an ethnic group in south-eastern Estonia and north-western Russia
Seto language, the language spoken by the Setos
My Bride Is a Mermaid, a manga and anime series
Seto (train), a former train service in Japan
Sunrise Seto, a train service in Japan
Great Seto Bridge, also Seto Ōhashi, a series of double deck bridges connecting Japanese islands Honshū and Shikoku.

Japanese-language surnames